

Events

Pre-1600
 306 – Constantine I is proclaimed Roman emperor by his troops.
 315 – The Arch of Constantine is completed near the Colosseum in Rome to commemorate Constantine I's victory over Maxentius at the Milvian Bridge. 
 677 – Climax of the Siege of Thessalonica by the Slavs in a three-day assault on the city walls.
 864 – The Edict of Pistres of Charles the Bald orders defensive measures against the Vikings.
1137 – Eleanor of Aquitaine marries Prince Louis, later King Louis VII of France, at the Cathedral of Saint-André in Bordeaux.
1139 – Battle of Ourique: The Almoravids, led by Ali ibn Yusuf, are defeated by Prince Afonso Henriques who is proclaimed King of Portugal.
1261 – The city of Constantinople is recaptured by Nicaean forces under the command of Alexios Strategopoulos, re-establishing the Byzantine Empire.
1278 – The naval Battle of Algeciras takes place in the context of the Spanish Reconquista resulting in a victory for the Emirate of Granada and the Maranid Dynasty over the Kingdom of Castile.
1467 – The Battle of Molinella: The first battle in Italy in which firearms are used extensively.
1536 – Sebastián de Belalcázar on his search of El Dorado founds the city of Santiago de Cali.
1538 – The city of Guayaquil is founded by the Spanish Conquistador Francisco de Orellana and given the name Muy Noble y Muy Leal Ciudad de Santiago de Guayaquil.
1547 – Henry II of France is crowned.
1554 – The royal wedding of Mary I and Philip II of Spain celebrated at Winchester Cathedral.
1567 – Don Diego de Losada founds the city of Santiago de Leon de Caracas, modern-day Caracas, the capital city of Venezuela. 
1591 – The Duke of Parma is defeated near the Dutch city of Nijmegen by an Anglo-Dutch force led by Maurice of Orange.
1593 – Henry IV of France publicly converts from Protestantism to Roman Catholicism.

1601–1900
1603 – James VI and I and Anne of Denmark are crowned in Westminster Abbey.
1609 – The English ship Sea Venture, en route to Virginia, is deliberately driven ashore during a storm at Bermuda to prevent its sinking; the survivors go on to found a new colony there.
1668 – A magnitude 8.5 earthquake strikes eastern China, killing over 42,000 people.
1693 – Ignacio de Maya founds the Real Santiago de las Sabinas, now known as Sabinas Hidalgo, Nuevo León, Mexico.
1718 – At the behest of Tsar Peter the Great, the construction of the Kadriorg Palace, dedicated to his wife Catherine, begins in Tallinn.
1722 – Dummer's War begins along the Maine-Massachusetts border.
1755 – British governor Charles Lawrence and the Nova Scotia Council order the deportation of the Acadians.
1759 – French and Indian War: In Western New York, British forces capture Fort Niagara from the French, who subsequently abandon Fort Rouillé. 
1783 – American Revolutionary War: The war's last action, the Siege of Cuddalore, is ended by a preliminary peace agreement.
1788 – Wolfgang Amadeus Mozart completes his Symphony No. 40 in G minor (K550).
1792 – The Brunswick Manifesto is issued to the population of Paris promising vengeance if the French royal family is harmed.
1797 – Horatio Nelson loses more than 300 men and his right arm during the failed conquest attempt of Tenerife (Spain).
1799 – Napoleon Bonaparte defeats a numerically superior Ottoman army under Mustafa Pasha at the Battle of Abukir.
1814 – War of 1812: An American attack on Canada is repulsed.
1824 – Costa Rica annexes Guanacaste from Nicaragua.
1837 – The first commercial use of an electrical telegraph is successfully demonstrated in London by William Cooke and Charles Wheatstone.
1853 – Joaquin Murrieta,  the famous Californio bandit known as the "Robin Hood of El Dorado", is killed. 
1861 – American Civil War: The United States Congress passes the Crittenden–Johnson Resolution, stating that the war is being fought to preserve the Union and not to end slavery, in the wake of the defeat at the First Battle of Bull Run.
1866 – The United States Congress passes legislation authorizing the rank of General of the Army. Lieutenant General Ulysses S. Grant becomes the first to be promoted to this rank.
1868 – The Wyoming Territory is established.
1869 – The Japanese daimyōs begin returning their land holdings to the emperor as part of the Meiji Restoration reforms. (Traditional Japanese Date: June 17, 1869).
1894 – The First Sino-Japanese War begins when the Japanese fire upon a Chinese warship.
1897 – American author Jack London embarks on a sailing trip to take part in the Klondike's gold rush, from which he wrote his first successful stories.
1898 – Spanish–American War: The American invasion of Spanish-held Puerto Rico begins, as United States Army troops under General Nelson A. Miles land and secure the port at Guánica.

1901–present
1908 – Ajinomoto is founded. Kikunae Ikeda of the Tokyo Imperial University discovers that a key ingredient in kombu soup stock is monosodium glutamate (MSG), and patents a process for manufacturing it. 
1909 – Louis Blériot makes the first flight across the English Channel in a heavier-than-air machine from Calais to Dover, England, United Kingdom in 37 minutes.
1915 – RFC Captain Lanoe Hawker becomes the first British pursuit aviator to earn the Victoria Cross.
1917 – Sir Robert Borden introduces the first income tax in Canada as a "temporary" measure (lowest bracket is 4% and highest is 25%).
1925 – Telegraph Agency of the Soviet Union (TASS) is established.
1934 – The Nazis assassinate Austrian Chancellor Engelbert Dollfuss in a failed coup attempt. 
1940 – General Henri Guisan orders the Swiss Army to resist German invasion and makes surrender illegal.
1942 – The Norwegian Manifesto calls for nonviolent resistance to the German occupation.
1943 – World War II: Benito Mussolini is forced out of office by the King (encouraged by the Grand Council of Fascism) and is replaced by Pietro Badoglio.
1944 – World War II: Operation Spring is one of the bloodiest days for the First Canadian Army during the war.
1946 – The Crossroads Baker device is the first underwater nuclear weapon test.
1957 – The Tunisian King Muhammad VIII al-Amin is replaced by President Habib Bourguiba.
1958 – The African Regroupment Party holds its first congress in Cotonou.
1961 – Cold War: In a speech John F. Kennedy emphasizes that any attack on Berlin is an attack on NATO.
1965 – Bob Dylan goes electric at the Newport Folk Festival, signaling a major change in folk and rock music.
1969 – Vietnam War: U.S. President Richard Nixon declares the Nixon Doctrine, stating that the United States now expects its Asian allies to take care of their own military defense. This is the start of the "Vietnamization" of the war.
1971 – The Sohagpur massacre is perpetrated by the Pakistan Army.
1973 – Soviet Mars 5 space probe is launched.
1976 – Viking program: Viking 1 takes the famous Face on Mars photo.
1978 – Puerto Rican police shoot two nationalists in the Cerro Maravilla murders.
1978 – Birth of Louise Joy Brown, the first human to have been born after conception by in vitro fertilisation, or IVF.
1979 – In accord with the Egypt–Israel peace treaty, Israel begins its withdrawal from the Sinai Peninsula.
1983 – Black July: Thirty-seven Tamil political prisoners at the Welikada high security prison in Colombo are massacred by the fellow Sinhalese prisoners.
1984 – Salyut 7 cosmonaut Svetlana Savitskaya becomes the first woman to perform a space walk.
1993 – Israel launches a massive attack against Lebanon in what the Israelis call Operation Accountability, and the Lebanese call the Seven-Day War.
  1993   – The Saint James Church massacre occurs in Kenilworth, Cape Town, South Africa.
1994 – Israel and Jordan sign the Washington Declaration, that formally ends the state of war that had existed between the nations since 1948.
1995 – A gas bottle explodes in Saint Michel station of line B of the RER (Paris regional train network). Eight are killed and 80 wounded.
1996 – In a military coup in Burundi, Pierre Buyoya deposes Sylvestre Ntibantunganya.
2000 – Concorde Air France Flight 4590 crashes outside of Paris shortly after taking off at Charles de Gaulle Airport, killing 113 people.
2007 – Pratibha Patil is sworn in as India's first female president.
2010 – WikiLeaks publishes classified documents about the War in Afghanistan, one of the largest leaks in U.S. military history.
2018 – As-Suwayda attacks: Coordinated attacks occur in Syria.
2019 – National extreme heat records set this day in the UK, Belgium, The Netherlands and Germany during the July 2019 European heat wave.

Births

Pre-1600
 975 – Thietmar, bishop of Merseburg (d. 1018)
1016 – Casimir I the Restorer, duke of Poland (d. 1058)
1109 – Afonso I, king of Portugal (d. 1185)
1165 – Ibn Arabi, Andalusian Sufi mystic, poet, and philosopher (d. 1240)
1261 – Arthur II, Duke of Brittany (d. 1312)
1291 – Hawys Gadarn, Welsh noblewoman (d. 1353)
1336 – Albert I, Duke of Bavaria (d. 1404)
1394 – James I, king of Scotland (d. 1437)
1404 – Philip I, Duke of Brabant (d. 1430)
1421 – Henry Percy, 3rd Earl of Northumberland, English politician (d. 1461)
1450 – Jakob Wimpfeling, Renaissance humanist (d. 1528)
1486 – Albrecht VII, Duke of Mecklenburg (d. 1547)
1498 – Hernando de Aragón, Archbishop of Zaragoza (d. 1575)
1532 – Alphonsus Rodriguez, Jesuit lay brother and saint (d. 1617)
1556 – George Peele, English translator, poet, and dramatist (d. 1596)
1562 – Katō Kiyomasa, Japanese warlord (d. 1611)
1573 – Christoph Scheiner, German astronomer and Jesuit (d. 1650)
1581 – Brian Twyne, English archivist (d. 1644)

1601–1900
1605 – Theodore Haak, German scholar (d. 1690)
1633 – Joseph Williamson, English politician (d. 1701)
1654 – Agostino Steffani, Italian composer and diplomat (d. 1728)
1657 – Philipp Heinrich Erlebach, German composer (d. 1714)
1658 – Archibald Campbell, 1st Duke of Argyll, Scottish general (d. 1703)
1683 – Pieter Langendijk, Dutch playwright and poet (d. 1756)
1750 – Henry Knox, American general and politician, 1st United States Secretary of War (d. 1806)
1753 – Santiago de Liniers, 1st Count of Buenos Aires, French-Spanish captain and politician, 10th Viceroy of the Viceroyalty of the Río de la Plata (d. 1810)
1797 – Princess Augusta of Hesse-Kassel (d. 1889)
1806 – Maria Weston Chapman, American abolitionist (d. 1885)
1839 – Francis Garnier, French captain and explorer (d. 1873)
1844 – Thomas Eakins, American painter, sculptor, and photographer (d. 1916)
1847 – Paul Langerhans,  German pathologist, physiologist and biologist (d. 1888)
1848 – Arthur Balfour, Scottish-English lieutenant and politician, 33rd Prime Minister of the United Kingdom (d. 1930)
1857 – Frank J. Sprague, American naval officer and inventor (d. 1934)
1865 – Jac. P. Thijsse, Dutch botanist and conservationist (d. 1945)
1866 – Frederick Blackman, English physiologist and academic (d. 1947)
1867 – Max Dauthendey, German author and painter (d. 1918)
  1867   – Alexander Rummler, American painter (d. 1959)
1869 – Platon, Estonian bishop and saint (d. 1919)
1870 – Maxfield Parrish, American painter and illustrator (d. 1966)
1875 – Jim Corbett, Indian hunter, environmentalist, and author (d. 1955)
1878 – Masaharu Anesaki, Japanese philosopher and scholar (d. 1949)
1882 – George S. Rentz, American commander (d. 1942)
1883 – Alfredo Casella, Italian pianist, composer, and conductor (d. 1947)
1886 – Edward Cummins, American golfer (d. 1926)
1894 – Walter Brennan, American actor (d. 1974)
  1894   – Gavrilo Princip, Bosnian Serb revolutionary (d. 1918)
1895 – Ingeborg Spangsfeldt, Danish actress (d. 1968)
1896 – Jack Perrin, American actor and stuntman (d. 1967)
  1896   – Josephine Tey, Scottish author and playwright (d. 1952)

1901–present
1901 – Ruth Krauss, American author and poet (d. 1993)
  1901   – Mohammed Helmy, Egyptian physician and Righteous Among the Nations (d. 1982)
  1901   – Lila Lee, American actress and singer (d. 1973)
1902 – Eric Hoffer, American philosopher and author (d. 1983)
1905 – Elias Canetti, Bulgarian-Swiss novelist, playwright, and memoirist, Nobel Prize laureate (d. 1994)
  1905   – Georges Grignard, French race car driver (d. 1977)
  1905   – Denys Watkins-Pitchford, English author and illustrator (d. 1990)
1906 – Johnny Hodges, American saxophonist and clarinet player (d. 1970)
1908 – Bill Bowes, English cricketer (d. 1987)
  1908   – Ambroise-Marie Carré, French priest and author (d. 2004)
  1908   – Jack Gilford, American actor (d. 1990)
1914 – Woody Strode, American football player and actor (d. 1994)
1915 – S. U. Ethirmanasingham, Sri Lankan businessman and politician
  1915   – Joseph P. Kennedy Jr., American lieutenant and pilot (d. 1944)
1916 – Lucien Saulnier, Canadian lawyer and politician (d. 1989)
1917 – Fritz Honegger, Swiss lawyer and politician (d. 1999)
1918 – Jane Frank, American painter and sculptor (d. 1986)
1920 – Rosalind Franklin, English biophysicist, chemist, and academic (d. 1958)
1921 – Adolph Herseth, American soldier and trumpet player  (d. 2013)
  1921   – Lionel Terray, French mountaineer (d. 1965)
1923 – Estelle Getty, American actress (d. 2008)
  1923   – Edgar Gilbert, American mathematician and theorist (d. 2013)
  1923   – Maria Gripe, Swedish journalist and author (d. 2007)
1924 – Frank Church, American lawyer and politician (d. 1984)
  1924   – Scotch Taylor, South African cricketer and hockey player (d. 2004)
1925 – Benny Benjamin, American R&B drummer (d. 1969)
  1925   – Jerry Paris, American actor and director (d. 1986)
  1925   – Dick Passwater, American race car driver (d. 2020)
  1925   – Jutta Zilliacus, Finnish journalist and politician
1926 – Whitey Lockman, American baseball player, coach, and manager (d. 2009)
  1926   – Bernard Thompson, British television producer and director (d. 1998)
  1926   – Beatriz Segall, Brazilian actress (d. 2018)
1927 – Daniel Ceccaldi, French actor, director, and screenwriter (d. 2003)
  1927   – Midge Decter, American journalist and author
  1927   – Sadiq Hussain Qureshi, Pakistani politician, 10th Governor of Punjab (d. 2000)
  1927   – Jean-Marie Seroney, Kenyan activist and politician (d. 1982)
1928 – Dolphy, Filipino actor, singer, and producer (d. 2012)
  1928   – Mario Montenegro, Filipino actor (d. 1988)
  1928   – Nils Taube, Estonian-English businessman (d. 2008) 
1929 – Judd Buchanan, Canadian businessman and politician, 36th Canadian Minister of Public Works
  1929   – Somnath Chatterjee, Indian lawyer and politician, 14th Speaker of the Lok Sabha (d. 2018)
  1929   – Eddie Mazur, Canadian ice hockey player (d. 1995)
1930 – Murray Chapple, New Zealand cricketer and manager (d. 1985)
  1930   – Maureen Forrester, Canadian actress and singer (d. 2010)
  1930   – Alice Parizeau, Polish-Canadian journalist and criminologist (d. 1990)
  1930   – Herbert Scarf, American economist and academic (d. 2015)
  1930   – Annie Ross, Scottish-American singer and actress (d. 2020)
1931 – James Butler, English sculptor and educator (d. 2022)
1932 – Paul J. Weitz, American astronaut (d. 2017)
1934 – Don Ellis, American trumpet player and composer (d. 1978)
  1934   – Claude Zidi, French director and screenwriter
1935 – Barbara Harris, American actress and singer (d. 2018)
  1935   – Adnan Khashoggi, Saudi Arabian businessman (d. 2017)
  1935   – Gilbert Parent, Canadian educator and politician, 33rd Speaker of the House of Commons of Canada (d. 2009)
  1935   – John Robinson, American football player and coach
  1935   – Larry Sherry, American baseball player and coach (d. 2006)
  1935   – Lars Werner, Swedish lawyer and politician (d. 2013)
1936 – Gerry Ashmore, English race car driver (d. 2021)
  1936   – Glenn Murcutt, English-Australian architect and academic
1937 – Colin Renfrew, Baron Renfrew of Kaimsthorn, English archaeologist and academic
1939 – S. Ramadoss, Indian politician
1940 – Richard Ballantine, American-English journalist and author (d. 2013)
1941 – Manny Charlton, Spanish-born Scottish rock musician and songwriter (d. 2022) 
  1941   – Nate Thurmond, American basketball player (d. 2016)
  1941   – Emmett Till, American lynching victim (d. 1955)
1942 – Bruce Woodley, Australian singer-songwriter and guitarist 
1943 – Jim McCarty, English singer and drummer 
  1943   – Erika Steinbach, Polish-German politician
1944 – Sally Beauman, English journalist and author (d. 2016)
1946 – José Areas, Nicaraguan drummer 
  1946   – Nicole Farhi, French fashion designer and sculptor
  1946   – John Gibson, American radio host
  1946   – Rita Marley, Cuban-Jamaican singer 
  1946   – P. Selvarasa, Sri Lankan politician
  1946   – Ljupka Dimitrovska, Macedonian-Croatian pop singer (d. 2016)
1948 – Steve Goodman, American singer-songwriter and guitarist (d. 1984)
1950 – Mark Clarke, English singer-songwriter and bass player 
1951 – Jack Thompson, American lawyer and activist 
  1951   – Verdine White, American bass player and producer 
1952 – Eduardo Souto de Moura, Portuguese architect, designed the Estádio Municipal de Braga
1953 – Joseph A. Tunzi, Chicago based author, foremost expert on Elvis Presley
  1953   – Robert Zoellick, American banker and politician, 14th United States Deputy Secretary of State
1954 – Ken Greer, Canadian guitarist, keyboard player, and producer 
  1954   – Sheena McDonald, Scottish journalist
  1954   – Walter Payton, American football player and race car driver (d. 1999)
  1954   – Jochem Ziegert, German footballer and manager
1955 – Iman, Somalian-English model and actress
  1955   – Randall Bewley, American guitarist and songwriter (d. 2009)
  1956   – Frances Arnold, American scientist and engineer
1957 – Mark Hunter, English politician
  1957   – Steve Podborski, Canadian skier 
1958 – Alexei Filippenko, American astrophysicist and academic
  1958   – Thurston Moore, American singer-songwriter, guitarist, and producer 
1959 – Fyodor Cherenkov, Russian footballer and manager (d. 2014)
  1959   – Geoffrey Zakarian, American chef and author
1960 – Alain Robidoux, Canadian snooker player
  1960   – Justice Howard, American photographer
  1960   – Māris Martinsons, Latvian film director, producer, screenwriter, and editor
1962 – Carin Bakkum, Dutch tennis player
  1962   – Doug Drabek, American baseball player and coach
1963 – Denis Coderre, Canadian politician, 44th Mayor of Montreal
  1963   – Julian Hodgson, Welsh chess player
1964 – Anne Applebaum, American journalist and author
  1964   – Tony Granato, American ice hockey player and coach
  1964   – Breuk Iversen, American designer and journalist
1965 – Marty Brown, American singer-songwriter and guitarist 
  1965   – Illeana Douglas, American actress, director, producer, and screenwriter
  1965   – Dale Shearer, Australian rugby league player
1966 – Daryl Halligan, New Zealand rugby player and sportscaster
  1966   – Maureen Herman, American bass player 
  1966   – Diana Johnson, English politician
1967 – Matt LeBlanc, American actor and producer
  1967   – Ruth Peetoom, Dutch minister and politician
  1967   – Tommy Skjerven, Norwegian footballer and referee
1968 – Rudi Bryson, South African cricketer
  1968   – Shi Tao, Chinese journalist and poet
1969 – Jon Barry, American basketball player and sportscaster
  1969   – Annastacia Palaszczuk, Australian politician, 39th Premier of Queensland
1971 – Roger Creager, American singer-songwriter
  1971   – Tracy Murray, American basketball player
  1971   – Billy Wagner, American baseball player and coach
1972 – David Penna, Australian rugby league player and coach
1973 – Dani Filth, English singer-songwriter 
  1973   – Kevin Phillips, English footballer
  1973   – Igli Tare, Albanian footballer  
1974 – Lauren Faust, American animator, producer, and screenwriter
  1974   – Julia Laffranque, Estonian lawyer and judge
  1974   – Kenzo Suzuki, Japanese rugby player and wrestler
1975 – Jody Craddock, English footballer and coach
  1975   – Jean-Claude Darcheville, Guianan-French footballer
  1975   – El Zorro, Mexican wrestler
  1975   – Brian Gibson, American bass player 
  1975   – Evgeni Nabokov, Russian ice hockey player
1976 – Marcos Assunção, Brazilian footballer
  1976   – Jovica Tasevski-Eternijan, Macedonian poet and critic
  1976   – Javier Vázquez, Puerto Rican-American baseball player
1977 – Kenny Thomas, American basketball player
1978 – Gerard Warren, American football player
  1978   – Louise Joy Brown, first human to be born via IVF
1979 – Ali Carter, English snooker player
  1979   – Tom Lungley, English cricketer and umpire
1980 – Shawn Riggans, American baseball player
  1980   – Toni Vilander, Finnish race car driver
  1980   – David Wachs, American actor and producer
  1980   – Scott Waldrom, New Zealand rugby player
1981 – Conor Casey, American soccer player
  1981   – Constantinos Charalambidis, Cypriot footballer
  1981   – Yūichi Komano, Japanese footballer
  1981   – Mac Lethal, American rapper and producer
  1981   – Jani Rita, Finnish ice hockey player
1982 – Brad Renfro, American actor and musician (d. 2008)
1982 – Jason Dundas, Australian TV host
1983 – Nenad Krstić, Serbian basketball player
1984 – Loukas Mavrokefalidis, Greek basketball player
1985 – James Lafferty, American actor and athlete
  1985   – Nelson Piquet Jr., Brazilian race car driver
  1985   – Hugo Rodallega, Colombian footballer
1986 – Abraham Gneki Guié, Ivorian footballer
  1986   – Hulk, Brazilian footballer
1987 – Richard Bachman, American ice hockey player
  1987   – Mitchell Burgzorg, Dutch footballer and rapper
  1987   – Fernando, Brazilian footballer
  1987   – Jax Jones, English DJ, singer and songwriter
  1987   – Eran Zahavi, Israeli footballer
1988 – John Goossens, Dutch footballer 
  1988   – Tom Hiariej, Dutch footballer 
  1988   – Stacey Kemp, English skater
  1988   – Paulinho, Brazilian footballer
  1988   – Anthony Stokes, Irish footballer
1989 – Natalia Vieru, Russian basketball player
1990 – Thodoris Karapetsas, Greek footballer
1991 – Hasan Piker, Twitch streamer
1991 – Toni Duggan, English footballer
1992 – Sergei Simonov, Russian ice hockey player (d. 2016)
1994 – Natalija Stevanović, Serbian tennis player
1995 – Maria Sakkari, Greek tennis player
1997 – Nat Butcher, Australian rugby league player

Deaths

Pre-1600
 306 – Constantius Chlorus, Roman emperor (b. 250)
 885 – Ragenold, margrave of Neustria
1011 – Ichijō, emperor of Japan (b. 980)
1190 – Sibylla, queen of Jerusalem
1195 – Herrad of Landsberg, abbess, author, and illustrator (b. c. 1130)
1409 – Martin I, king of Sicily (b. 1376)
1471 – Thomas à Kempis, German priest and mystic
1472 – Charles of Artois, French nobleman (b. 1394)
1492 – Innocent VIII, pope of the Catholic Church (b. 1432)
1564 – Ferdinand I, Holy Roman Emperor (b. 1503)
1572 – Isaac Luria, Ottoman rabbi and mystic (b. 1534)

1601–1900
1608 – Pomponio Nenna, Italian composer (b. 1556)
1616 – Andreas Libavius, German physician and chemist (b. 1550)
1643 – Robert Pierrepont, 1st Earl of Kingston-upon-Hull, English general and politician (b. 1584)
1681 – Urian Oakes, English-American minister and educator (b. 1631)
1790 – Johann Bernhard Basedow, German educator and reformer (b. 1723)
  1790   – William Livingston, American soldier and politician, 1st Governor of New Jersey (b. 1723)
1791 – Isaac Low, American merchant and politician (b. 1735)
1794 – André Chénier, Greek-French poet and author (b. 1762)
  1794   – Jean-Antoine Roucher, French poet and author (b. 1745)
  1794   – Friedrich von der Trenck, Prussian adventurer and author (b. 1726)
1826 – Kondraty Ryleyev, Russian poet and publisher (b. 1795)
1831 – Maria Szymanowska, Polish composer and pianist (b. 1789)
1834 – Samuel Taylor Coleridge, English philosopher, poet, and critic (b. 1772)
1842 – Dominique Jean Larrey, French physician and surgeon (b. 1766)
1843 – Charles Macintosh, Scottish chemist and inventor of waterproof fabric (b. 1766)
1861 – Jonas Furrer, Swiss lawyer and politician, President of the Swiss Confederation (b. 1805)
1865 – James Barry, English soldier and surgeon (b. 1799)
1887 – John Taylor, American religious leader, 3rd President of The Church of Jesus Christ of Latter-day Saints (b. 1808)

1901–present
1934 – François Coty, French businessman, founded Coty, Inc. (b. 1874)
  1934   – Engelbert Dollfuss, Austrian politician, 14th Chancellor of Austria (b. 1892)
  1934   – Nestor Makhno, Ukrainian anarchist revolutionary (b. 1888)
1942 – Fred Englehardt, American triple jumper (b. 1879)
1952 – Herbert Murrill, English organist and composer (b. 1909)
1958 – Otto Lasanen, Finnish wrestler (b. 1891)
1959 – Yitzhak HaLevi Herzog, Polish-born Irish rabbi and author (b. 1888)
1962 – Thibaudeau Rinfret, Canadian lawyer and jurist, 9th Chief Justice of Canada (b. 1879)
1963 – Ugo Cerletti, Italian neurologist and academic (b. 1877)
1966 – Frank O'Hara, American poet and critic (b. 1926)
1967 – Konstantinos Parthenis, Egyptian-Greek painter (b. 1878)
1971 – John Meyers, American swimmer and water polo player (b. 1880)
  1971   – Leroy Robertson, American composer and educator (b. 1896)
1973 – Amy Jacques Garvey, Jamaican-American journalist and activist (b. 1895)
  1973   – Louis St. Laurent, Canadian lawyer and politician, 12th Prime Minister of Canada (b. 1882)
1977 – Shivrampant Damle, Indian educationist (b. 1900)
1980 – Vladimir Vysotsky, Russian singer-songwriter, guitarist, and actor (b. 1938)
1981 – Rosa A. González, Puerto Rican nurse, author, feminist, and activist (b. 1889)
1982 – Hal Foster, Canadian-American author and illustrator (b. 1892)
1984 – Bryan Hextall, Canadian ice hockey player (b. 1913)
  1984   – Big Mama Thornton, American singer-songwriter (b. 1926)
1986 – Vincente Minnelli, American director and screenwriter (b. 1903)
1988 – Judith Barsi, American child actress (b. 1978)
1989 – Steve Rubell, American businessman, co-owner of Studio 54 (b. 1943)
1991 – Lazar Kaganovich, Soviet politician (b. 1893)
1992 – Alfred Drake, American actor and singer (b. 1914)
1995 – Charlie Rich, American singer-songwriter (b. 1932)
1997 – Ben Hogan, American golfer (b. 1912)
1998 – Evangelos Papastratos, Greek businessman, co-founded Papastratos (b. 1910)
2000 – Rudi Faßnacht, German footballer, coach, and manager (b. 1934)
2002 – Abdel Rahman Badawi, Egyptian philosopher and poet (b. 1917)
2003 – Ludwig Bölkow, German engineer (b. 1912)
  2003   – John Schlesinger, English actor, director, producer, and screenwriter (b. 1926)
2004 – John Passmore, Australian philosopher and academic (b. 1914)
2005 – Albert Mangelsdorff, German trombonist (b. 1928)
2006 – Ezra Fleischer, Romanian-Israeli poet and philologist (b. 1928)
2007 – Bernd Jakubowski, German footballer and manager (b. 1952)
2008 – Jeff Fehring, Australian footballer (b. 1955)
  2008   – Tracy Hall, American chemist and academic (b. 1919)
  2008   – Randy Pausch, American computer scientist and educator (b. 1960)
2009 – Vernon Forrest, American boxer (b. 1971)
  2009   – Stanley Middleton, English author (b. 1919)
  2009   – Harry Patch, English soldier (b. 1898)
  2009   – Yasmin Ahmad, Malaysian film director (b. 1958)
2011 – Michael Cacoyannis, Cypriot-Greek director, producer, and screenwriter (b. 1922)
2012 – B. R. Ishara, Indian director and screenwriter (b. 1934)
  2012   – Barry Langford, English director and producer (b. 1926)
  2012   – Greg Mohns, American-Canadian football player and coach (b. 1950)
  2012   – Franz West, Austrian painter and sculptor (b. 1947)
2013 – Walter De Maria, American sculptor, illustrator, and composer (b. 1935)
  2013   – William J. Guste, American lawyer and politician (b. 1922)
  2013   – Hugh Huxley, English-American biologist and academic (b. 1924)
2014 – Bel Kaufman, German-American author and academic (b. 1911)
  2014   – Richard Larter, Australian painter and illustrator (b. 1929)
2015 – Jacques Andreani, French diplomat, French ambassador to the United States (b. 1929)
  2015   – R. S. Gavai, Indian lawyer and politician, 18th Governor of Kerala (b. 1929)
  2015   – Bob Kauffman, American basketball player and coach (b. 1946)
2016 – Tim LaHaye, American Christian minister and author (b. 1926)
  2016   – Tom Peterson, American television personality (b. 1930)
2017 – Michael Johnson, American singer-songwriter and guitarist (b. 1944)
2018 – Sergio Marchionne, Italian-Canadian businessman (b. 1952)
2019 – Beji Caid Essebsi, 4th President and 9th Prime Minister of Tunisia (b. 1926)
2020 – Peter Green, English blues rock guitarist, singer-songwriter and founder of Fleetwood Mac (b. 1946)
  2020   – Lou Henson, American college basketball coach (b. 1932)    
2022 – Paul Sorvino, American actor (b. 1939)

Holidays and observances
Christian feast day:
Anne (Eastern Christianity)
Christopher (Western Christianity)
Cucuphas
Glodesind
James the Great (Western Christianity) 
John I Agnus
Julian of Le Mans (translation)
Magnerich of Trier
July 25 (Eastern Orthodox liturgics)
Earliest day on which Father's Day can fall, while July 31 is the latest; celebrated on last Sunday in July. (Dominican Republic)
Earliest day on which National Tree Planting Day can fall, while July 31 is the latest; celebrated on last Sunday in July. (Australia)
Earliest day on which Navy Day can fall, while July 31 is the latest; celebrated on last Sunday in July. (Russia)
Guanacaste Day (Costa Rica)
National Baha'i Day (Jamaica) 
National Day of Galicia (Galicia, Spain)
Puerto Rico Constitution Day (Puerto Rico)
Republic Day (Tunisia)

References

External links

 
 
 

Days of the year
July